Axel Prohouly (born 30 June 1997) is a French footballer who plays as a midfielder for US Saint-Omer.

Seen as a top prospect as a teenager, he was courted by Barcelona and Chelsea, though ended up signing with Queens Park Rangers from Monaco in June 2015. He had a brief loan spell with Port Vale in January 2017, but left QPR twelve months later without having played a first-team game. He returned to France and had short spells with amateur clubs Racing Club de France, Lorient B, Loon-Plage and Grande-Synthe. He signed with Slovenian club Radomlje, making his professional debut in February 2022 at the age of 24.

Club career

Queens Park Rangers
At the age of 13, Prohouly received offers from the youth academies of Spanish La Liga side Barcelona and Chelsea in the English Premier League. He spent five years as an amateur player with AS Monaco, before signing a three-year contract with English Championship club Queens Park Rangers in June 2015. He scored five goals in 18 appearances for QPR's under-21 team in the 2015–16 season. On 31 January 2017, Prohouly signed with EFL League One side Port Vale on loan until the end of the 2016–17 season. However he failed to make an appearance at either QPR or Port Vale and ended his loan spell at Vale Park early to return to Loftus Road. He agreed to have his contract at Queens Park Rangers terminated in January 2018.

French amateur leagues
Prohouly turned down a contract offer from Red Star in the hope of a more financially lucrative offer that never came. Before the second half of the 2018–19 season, he signed for Racing Club de France in the Championnat National 3. He played his first game in senior football on 16 February 2019, in a 0–0 draw with Les Mureaux at Stade Yves-du-Manoir, and made two further appearances for the club. In 2019, he signed for Championnat National 2 team Lorient B. He scored his first career goal on 17 August 2019, during a 1–1 draw at Fleury 91. He rejected the chance to play in Bulgaria as he wanted his wife to be able to commute to London. In 2021, he signed for Grande-Synthe in Régional 1. He helped the sixth-tier club to reach the Round of 64 in the Coupe de France, where they were beaten by Boulogne.

Radomlje
Before the second half of the 2021–22 season, Prohouly signed for Slovenian PrvaLiga side Radomlje. On 14 February 2022, he made his professional debut for Radomlje during a 4–0 win at Aluminij. He retained his place seven days later for the 4–1 defeat by Maribor at Domžale Sports Park.

International career
Prohouly was capped at under-16 and under-19 level, winning the 2012 Tournoi du Val-de-Marne with the under-16s.

Style of play
Prohouly is primarily a central midfielder, but can play anywhere across the midfield. He has good speed, dribbling and heading skills.

Personal life
Prohouly married Jennifer, an Austrian model, in 2017.

Career statistics

References

External links
Axel Prohouly at French Football Federation 

1997 births
Living people
People from Grasse
Footballers from Provence-Alpes-Côte d'Azur
Sportspeople from Alpes-Maritimes
French footballers
France youth international footballers
Association football midfielders
Association football wingers
AS Monaco FC players
Queens Park Rangers F.C. players
Port Vale F.C. players
Racing Club de France Football players
FC Lorient players
Olympique Grande-Synthe players
NK Radomlje players
Championnat National 3 players
Championnat National 2 players
Régional 1 players
Slovenian PrvaLiga players
French expatriate footballers
Expatriate footballers in England
Expatriate footballers in Slovenia
French expatriate sportspeople in England
French expatriate sportspeople in Slovenia